The Lincoln Vicksburg Monument, also known as the Lincoln and Soldiers' Monument, is a marble memorial commemorating Abraham Lincoln and victims of the American Civil War by Thomas Dow Jones, installed in the Ohio Statehouse's rotunda, in Columbus, Ohio, United States.

The monument is the oldest known work of public art in Columbus, Ohio.

References

External links

 

Abraham Lincoln in art
Busts in the United States
Downtown Columbus, Ohio
Marble sculptures in the United States
Monuments and memorials in Ohio
Monuments and memorials to Abraham Lincoln
Ohio Statehouse
Public art in Columbus, Ohio
Sculptures of men in Ohio